Andrew J. Dawkins (born July 29, 1950) is an American politician and attorney from Minnesota. Dawkins is a former member of the Minnesota House of Representatives from Saint Paul. Running as a Democrat, Dawkins was first elected in 1986 to represent District 65A, and was reelected every two years until opting not to seek reelection in 2002.  In 1993, he ran an unsuccessful campaign for mayor of Saint Paul against Norm Coleman. He married Ellen Anderson, a Minnesota state senator from St. Paul, in 1995; they divorced in 2018. He was the Green Party of Minnesota nominee for Minnesota Attorney General in the 2014 election, earning 1.5% of the vote and restoring the party's minor-party status.

Biography 
Originally from Chicago, Dawkins came to Minnesota in the late 1960s to attend the Hamline University School of Law in St. Paul. During law school, he moved to Philadelphia to work with homeless youth, but intended to return to Minnesota. In 1978, he established a neighborhood law practice in Saint Paul's Frogtown neighborhood and set a personal goal of gaining election to the Legislature within 10 years. Before joining the Legislature, Dawkins said it was important to him that he get to know the neighborhood and its residents' concerns, so he volunteered for a number of community organizations and the Minnesota Democratic–Farmer–Labor Party.

First elected to the House in a November 1987 special election, Dawkins filled the District 65A seat vacated by former Speaker of the House Fred Norton (DFL-St. Paul) upon Norton's appointment to the state Court of Appeals.

After leaving the legislature in 2003, Dawkins led the department of Neighborhood Housing and Property Improvement for the city of Saint Paul for several years. In 2006, he began working as an attorney at the law firm of Mansfield, Tanick, and Cohen.

In June 2014 Dawkins announced that he would run for Minnesota Attorney General under the Green Party banner.

If Dawkins had won 5 percent of the vote, it would have elevated the Minnesota Green Party to the major-party status it once held in Minnesota.

Minnesota House of Representatives
Dawkins served on several House committees during his time in the Minnesota House, including those governing capital investment, family and civil law, energy and regulated industries, environment and natural resources, financial institutions and insurance, housing, jobs and economic development, and taxes.

He also sponsored youth works legislation to provide college tuition to students volunteering in communities, much like the AmeriCorps program; the Great Northern Corridor economic development project; and a homeownership program for urban and low-income residents. Dawkins also sponsored several measures in an effort to raise awareness of drug crimes and prostitution problems in Frogtown and to study racial bias in the state court system.

Positions

Money in Politics
As a DFL State Legislator for 15 years, Dawkins saw firsthand how money dictated what got done in government:

I had enough seniority as a democrat to be the tax chair in the Minnesota Legislature but I was told 'Dawkins you'll never be the tax chair 'cause you pissed off the real-estate industry, you pissed off the bankers, and you tried to do the tax stuff the right way for the little guys and they’re not going to let you be the tax chair'. I was told that I'm not going to be the tax chair unless I can get these big lobbyists to support me to be the tax chair.  Minnesota's no different than Washington; big money runs our country on every level these days.

Who gets to run, who gets elected, what gets enacted, who gets served by what gets enacted is all ruled by big money these days. I would get the million dollars once in a while for a little housing program or start a youth program ... but when you're talking about the hundreds of millions of dollars that's at play all the time in politics; if the insurance companies don't like your bill then it ain't gonna move, if you don't write something in so that they come out o.k. the bankers and the finance industries and the lenders will put a stop to it, it's up and down the line.

Sulfide/Copper Nickel Mining
Dawkins is strongly opposed to the Polymet Mining Corporation and Twin Metals Minnesota LLC proposed sulfide/copper-nickel mines in northern Minnesota. Because of the threat of acid mine drainage to the Boundary Waters Canoe Area Wilderness and the short term nature of the jobs these mines will create, Dawkins had this to say:

I don't think we need to do any sort of sulfide mining, period ... the whole thing is about profit for foreign investors, and to then argue there's a few jobs in the mining industry, well, compare that to the amount of jobs we'd get if we keep doing renewables and sustainables. Until we have that debate, I'm totally against.

Ranked Choice Voting
Dawkins supported the instant-runoff voting (ranked choice voting) ballot initiative early on in the city of Saint Paul. With his Minnesota Attorney General campaign, Dawkins is endorsing the idea of a statewide adoption of ranked choice voting.

Cannabis Legalization
Dawkins supports legalizing "sensible" use of recreational marijuana.

Electoral history

See also
Politics of Minnesota
Green Party of Minnesota
Green Party of the United States
Green Politics
Frogtown

References

External links

 Dawkins for Attorney General

1950 births
Living people
People from Ramsey County, Minnesota
Politicians from Saint Paul, Minnesota
Hamline University alumni
Temple University Beasley School of Law alumni
Democratic Party members of the Minnesota House of Representatives
Minnesota lawyers
Minnesota Greens
21st-century American politicians